KIS Yangmu (양무호,揚武號) was the first ship of the Korean Imperial Navy. This ship was built by Sir Raylton Dixon & Co and named "SS Pallas". This ship launched on 1881 and used in Clark George Ltd, Sunderland. In 1893, this ship sold to the Japan's Mitsui Corporation, and Named "Kachidate Maru". Next 1903,  It was purchased by the Korean empire from Mitsui Corporation with 1,100,000 Korean Won, or 550,000 Japanese Yen. This was about 30% of the total military budget of the Korean Empire. The ship, however, was not very effective because its previous use as a cargo ship.

References

An, Joo Yun. "The Korean Empire: a 13-year Plan." History Special. Dir. Jung Hoon Go. KBS. KBS1, Seoul, 22 Sept. 2006. Television.

1881 ships
Korean Empire
Naval ships of Korea
Ships built on the River Tees